The 2005–06 Florida Panthers season was their 13th season in the National Hockey League. The Panthers failed to qualify for the playoffs for the fifth consecutive season.

Offseason
Just prior to the start of the regular season it was announced Olli Jokinen would remain team captain and Chris Gratton, Sean Hill, Joe Nieuwendyk, and Gary Roberts would rotate as alternate captains.

Regular season
The Panthers were shut out a league-high 8 times and had the fewest power-play opportunities of all 30 teams, with 411.

Final standings

Schedule and results

|- align="center" bgcolor="#CCFFCC" 
|1||W||October 5, 2005||2–0 || align="left"|  Atlanta Thrashers (2005–06) ||1–0–0 || 
|- align="center" bgcolor="#CCFFCC" 
|2||W||October 7, 2005||2–0 || align="left"|  Tampa Bay Lightning (2005–06) ||2–0–0 || 
|- align="center" bgcolor="#FFBBBB"
|3||L||October 8, 2005||1–2 || align="left"| @ Tampa Bay Lightning (2005–06) ||2–1–0 || 
|- align="center" bgcolor="#CCFFCC" 
|4||W||October 10, 2005||3–1 || align="left"| @ New York Islanders (2005–06) ||3–1–0 || 
|- align="center" bgcolor="#FFBBBB"
|5||L||October 13, 2005||2–5 || align="left"|  Boston Bruins (2005–06) ||3–2–0 || 
|- align="center" bgcolor="#CCFFCC" 
|6||W||October 15, 2005||3–2 || align="left"|  Buffalo Sabres (2005–06) ||4–2–0 || 
|- align="center" bgcolor="#FFBBBB"
|7||L||October 17, 2005||0–4 || align="left"| @ New York Rangers (2005–06) ||4–3–0 || 
|- align="center" bgcolor="#FFBBBB"
|8||L||October 18, 2005||3–4 || align="left"| @ New Jersey Devils (2005–06) ||4–4–0 || 
|- align="center" bgcolor="#CCFFCC" 
|9||W||October 20, 2005||3–2 || align="left"|  Washington Capitals (2005–06) ||5–4–0 || 
|- align="center" bgcolor="#CCFFCC" 
|10||W||October 25, 2005||4–3 OT|| align="left"| @ Pittsburgh Penguins (2005–06) ||6–4–0 || 
|- align="center" 
|11||L||October 27, 2005||4–5 OT|| align="left"| @ Philadelphia Flyers (2005–06) ||6–4–1 || 
|- align="center" bgcolor="#FFBBBB"
|12||L||October 31, 2005||1–2 || align="left"| @ Toronto Maple Leafs (2005–06) ||6–5–1 || 
|-

|- align="center" 
|13||L||November 1, 2005||4–5 OT|| align="left"| @ Montreal Canadiens (2005–06) ||6–5–2 || 
|- align="center" bgcolor="#FFBBBB"
|14||L||November 3, 2005||1–4 || align="left"| @ Boston Bruins (2005–06) ||6–6–2 || 
|- align="center" bgcolor="#FFBBBB"
|15||L||November 5, 2005||0–2 || align="left"| @ Carolina Hurricanes (2005–06) ||6–7–2 || 
|- align="center" 
|16||L||November 9, 2005||3–4 SO|| align="left"|  New York Rangers (2005–06) ||6–7–3 || 
|- align="center" bgcolor="#FFBBBB"
|17||L||November 11, 2005||0–1 || align="left"|  Carolina Hurricanes (2005–06) ||6–8–3 || 
|- align="center" bgcolor="#FFBBBB"
|18||L||November 12, 2005||4–5 || align="left"| @ Philadelphia Flyers (2005–06) ||6–9–3 || 
|- align="center" 
|19||L||November 15, 2005||3–4 OT|| align="left"| @ Montreal Canadiens (2005–06) ||6–9–4 || 
|- align="center" bgcolor="#FFBBBB"
|20||L||November 17, 2005||1–4 || align="left"| @ Ottawa Senators (2005–06) ||6–10–4 || 
|- align="center" bgcolor="#FFBBBB"
|21||L||November 19, 2005||3–5 || align="left"|  New York Islanders (2005–06) ||6–11–4 || 
|- align="center" bgcolor="#FFBBBB"
|22||L||November 23, 2005||1–5 || align="left"|  New Jersey Devils (2005–06) ||6–12–4 || 
|- align="center" bgcolor="#CCFFCC" 
|23||W||November 25, 2005||6–3 || align="left"|  Pittsburgh Penguins (2005–06) ||7–12–4 || 
|- align="center" bgcolor="#FFBBBB"
|24||L||November 26, 2005||4–7 || align="left"| @ Atlanta Thrashers (2005–06) ||7–13–4 || 
|- align="center" bgcolor="#FFBBBB"
|25||L||November 28, 2005||1–2 || align="left"|  Toronto Maple Leafs (2005–06) ||7–14–4 || 
|-

|- align="center" bgcolor="#CCFFCC" 
|26||W||December 1, 2005||3–2 || align="left"|  Washington Capitals (2005–06) ||8–14–4 || 
|- align="center" bgcolor="#CCFFCC" 
|27||W||December 3, 2005||4–3 OT|| align="left"|  Chicago Blackhawks (2005–06) ||9–14–4 || 
|- align="center" bgcolor="#FFBBBB"
|28||L||December 5, 2005||3–6 || align="left"|  Ottawa Senators (2005–06) ||9–15–4 || 
|- align="center" bgcolor="#FFBBBB"
|29||L||December 7, 2005||3–4 || align="left"| @ Dallas Stars (2005–06) ||9–16–4 || 
|- align="center" bgcolor="#FFBBBB"
|30||L||December 8, 2005||2–6 || align="left"| @ San Jose Sharks (2005–06) ||9–17–4 || 
|- align="center" bgcolor="#FFBBBB"
|31||L||December 10, 2005||1–3 || align="left"| @ Los Angeles Kings (2005–06) ||9–18–4 || 
|- align="center" bgcolor="#CCFFCC" 
|32||W||December 13, 2005||7–3 || align="left"|  Nashville Predators (2005–06) ||10–18–4 || 
|- align="center" bgcolor="#CCFFCC" 
|33||W||December 15, 2005||3–2 OT|| align="left"|  Detroit Red Wings (2005–06) ||11–18–4 || 
|- align="center" bgcolor="#FFBBBB"
|34||L||December 17, 2005||1–2 || align="left"| @ Atlanta Thrashers (2005–06) ||11–19–4 || 
|- align="center" bgcolor="#CCFFCC" 
|35||W||December 18, 2005||3–2 || align="left"| @ Washington Capitals (2005–06) ||12–19–4 || 
|- align="center" bgcolor="#CCFFCC" 
|36||W||December 22, 2005||4–1 || align="left"|  Buffalo Sabres (2005–06) ||13–19–4 || 
|- align="center" bgcolor="#FFBBBB"
|37||L||December 23, 2005||3–4 || align="left"| @ Carolina Hurricanes (2005–06) ||13–20–4 || 
|- align="center" 
|38||L||December 26, 2005||2–3 SO|| align="left"|  Philadelphia Flyers (2005–06) ||13–20–5 || 
|- align="center" bgcolor="#CCFFCC" 
|39||W||December 28, 2005||6–4 || align="left"|  Boston Bruins (2005–06) ||14–20–5 || 
|- align="center" bgcolor="#CCFFCC" 
|40||W||December 30, 2005||2–1 || align="left"|  Montreal Canadiens (2005–06) ||15–20–5 || 
|-

|- align="center" bgcolor="#CCFFCC" 
|41||W||January 1, 2006||2–1 || align="left"| @ Buffalo Sabres (2005–06) ||16–20–5 || 
|- align="center" bgcolor="#FFBBBB"
|42||L||January 3, 2006||0–3 || align="left"| @ New Jersey Devils (2005–06) ||16–21–5 || 
|- align="center" 
|43||L||January 4, 2006||3–4 OT|| align="left"| @ New York Islanders (2005–06) ||16–21–6 || 
|- align="center" bgcolor="#FFBBBB"
|44||L||January 7, 2006||0–4 || align="left"| @ New York Rangers (2005–06) ||16–22–6 || 
|- align="center" bgcolor="#CCFFCC" 
|45||W||January 8, 2006||4–3 SO|| align="left"| @ Washington Capitals (2005–06) ||17–22–6 || 
|- align="center" bgcolor="#CCFFCC" 
|46||W||January 12, 2006||3–1 || align="left"|  St. Louis Blues (2005–06) ||18–22–6 || 
|- align="center" 
|47||L||January 14, 2006||4–5 OT|| align="left"|  Columbus Blue Jackets (2005–06) ||18–22–7 || 
|- align="center" bgcolor="#FFBBBB"
|48||L||January 19, 2006||3–6 || align="left"| @ Phoenix Coyotes (2005–06) ||18–23–7 || 
|- align="center" bgcolor="#FFBBBB"
|49||L||January 21, 2006||0–1 || align="left"| @ Mighty Ducks of Anaheim (2005–06) ||18–24–7 || 
|- align="center" bgcolor="#CCFFCC" 
|50||W||January 24, 2006||3–2 OT|| align="left"| @ Tampa Bay Lightning (2005–06) ||19–24–7 || 
|- align="center" 
|51||L||January 25, 2006||3–4 SO|| align="left"|  Carolina Hurricanes (2005–06) ||19–24–8 || 
|- align="center" bgcolor="#CCFFCC" 
|52||W||January 27, 2006||4–0 || align="left"|  New Jersey Devils (2005–06) ||20–24–8 || 
|- align="center" bgcolor="#FFBBBB"
|53||L||January 30, 2006||2–4 || align="left"|  Toronto Maple Leafs (2005–06) ||20–25–8 || 
|-

|- align="center" bgcolor="#CCFFCC" 
|54||W||February 3, 2006||5–2 || align="left"|  Atlanta Thrashers (2005–06) ||21–25–8 || 
|- align="center" bgcolor="#FFBBBB"
|55||L||February 4, 2006||4–6 || align="left"| @ Atlanta Thrashers (2005–06) ||21–26–8 || 
|- align="center" bgcolor="#CCFFCC" 
|56||W||February 7, 2006||5–0 || align="left"| @ Washington Capitals (2005–06) ||22–26–8 || 
|- align="center" bgcolor="#FFBBBB"
|57||L||February 11, 2006||3–5 || align="left"| @ Buffalo Sabres (2005–06) ||22–27–8 || 
|- align="center" bgcolor="#CCFFCC" 
|58||W||February 28, 2006||8–2 || align="left"| @ Tampa Bay Lightning (2005–06) ||23–27–8 || 
|-

|- align="center" bgcolor="#FFBBBB"
|59||L||March 2, 2006||0–1 || align="left"|  Montreal Canadiens (2005–06) ||23–28–8 || 
|- align="center" bgcolor="#FFBBBB"
|60||L||March 3, 2006||2–5 || align="left"| @ Carolina Hurricanes (2005–06) ||23–29–8 || 
|- align="center" 
|61||L||March 6, 2006||3–4 SO|| align="left"| @ Atlanta Thrashers (2005–06) ||23–29–9 || 
|- align="center" bgcolor="#CCFFCC" 
|62||W||March 8, 2006||6–2 || align="left"|  Ottawa Senators (2005–06) ||24–29–9 || 
|- align="center" bgcolor="#CCFFCC" 
|63||W||March 10, 2006||5–3 || align="left"|  Carolina Hurricanes (2005–06) ||25–29–9 || 
|- align="center" bgcolor="#CCFFCC" 
|64||W||March 11, 2006||4–3 OT|| align="left"|  Carolina Hurricanes (2005–06) ||26–29–9 || 
|- align="center" bgcolor="#FFBBBB"
|65||L||March 15, 2006||0–4 || align="left"|  Philadelphia Flyers (2005–06) ||26–30–9 || 
|- align="center" bgcolor="#CCFFCC" 
|66||W||March 17, 2006||4–2 || align="left"|  New York Islanders (2005–06) ||27–30–9 || 
|- align="center" bgcolor="#CCFFCC" 
|67||W||March 18, 2006||4–3 SO|| align="left"| @ Washington Capitals (2005–06) ||28–30–9 || 
|- align="center" bgcolor="#CCFFCC" 
|68||W||March 20, 2006||6–5 OT|| align="left"|  Tampa Bay Lightning (2005–06) ||29–30–9 || 
|- align="center" bgcolor="#CCFFCC" 
|69||W||March 22, 2006||3–2 || align="left"|  Washington Capitals (2005–06) ||30–30–9 || 
|- align="center" bgcolor="#CCFFCC" 
|70||W||March 24, 2006||3–2 SO|| align="left"|  New York Rangers (2005–06) ||31–30–9 || 
|- align="center" bgcolor="#CCFFCC" 
|71||W||March 27, 2006||4–3 SO|| align="left"| @ Boston Bruins (2005–06) ||32–30–9 || 
|- align="center" bgcolor="#CCFFCC" 
|72||W||March 29, 2006||5–3 || align="left"| @ Pittsburgh Penguins (2005–06) ||33–30–9 || 
|- align="center" bgcolor="#FFBBBB"
|73||L||March 31, 2006||2–3 || align="left"| @ Carolina Hurricanes (2005–06) ||33–31–9 || 
|-

|- align="center" bgcolor="#CCFFCC" 
|74||W||April 1, 2006||4–2 || align="left"|  Tampa Bay Lightning (2005–06) ||34–31–9 || 
|- align="center" bgcolor="#FFBBBB"
|75||L||April 3, 2006||1–4 || align="left"| @ Tampa Bay Lightning (2005–06) ||34–32–9 || 
|- align="center" bgcolor="#FFBBBB"
|76||L||April 5, 2006||2–5 || align="left"|  Atlanta Thrashers (2005–06) ||34–33–9 || 
|- align="center" bgcolor="#FFBBBB"
|77||L||April 7, 2006||1–5 || align="left"|  Pittsburgh Penguins (2005–06) ||34–34–9 || 
|- align="center" bgcolor="#CCFFCC" 
|78||W||April 9, 2006||6–3 || align="left"|  Tampa Bay Lightning (2005–06) ||35–34–9 || 
|- align="center" 
|79||L||April 11, 2006||5–6 OT|| align="left"| @ Toronto Maple Leafs (2005–06) ||35–34–10 || 
|- align="center" bgcolor="#CCFFCC" 
|80||W||April 13, 2006||5–4 OT|| align="left"| @ Ottawa Senators (2005–06) ||36–34–10 || 
|- align="center" 
|81||L||April 15, 2006||1–2 SO|| align="left"|  Washington Capitals (2005–06) ||36–34–11 || 
|- align="center" bgcolor="#CCFFCC" 
|82||W||April 18, 2006||2–1 OT|| align="left"|  Atlanta Thrashers (2005–06) ||37–34–11 || 
|-

|-
| Legend:

Player statistics

Scoring
 Position abbreviations: C = Center; D = Defense; G = Goaltender; LW = Left Wing; RW = Right Wing
  = Joined team via a transaction (e.g., trade, waivers, signing) during the season. Stats reflect time with the Panthers only.
  = Left team via a transaction (e.g., trade, waivers, release) during the season. Stats reflect time with the Panthers only.

Goaltending

Awards and records

Awards

Milestones

Transactions
The Panthers were involved in the following transactions from February 17, 2005, the day after the 2004–05 NHL season was officially cancelled, through June 19, 2006, the day of the deciding game of the 2006 Stanley Cup Finals.

Trades

Players acquired

Players lost

Signings

Draft picks
Florida's draft picks at the 2005 NHL Entry Draft held at the Westin Hotel in Ottawa, Ontario.

Notes

References

Flo
Flo
Florida Panthers seasons
Florida Panthers
Florida Panthers